TSCC may refer to:
Technical Support Call Center
Terminator: The Sarah Connor Chronicles
Twin Swirl Combustion Chamber, a feature of some Suzuki motorcycles such as the Suzuki GSX series
Toronto Standard Condominium Corporation